Rise is an album by Daryl Braithwaite released in November 1990. The album reached No. 3 on the Australian ARIA Charts. It was the best-selling album in Australia in 1991.
The album sold over 300,000 copies in Australia.

Braithwaite was nominated for ARIA Award for Best Male Artist at the ARIA Music Awards of 1991 for Rise, but lost to Chain Reaction by John Farnham.

Braithwaite commenced a national tour on 26 December 1990 in Warrnambool.

Although this album was not officially released in the U.S., it includes what would become Braithwaite's biggest stateside hit, "Higher Than Hope", which reached number 47 on the Billboard Hot 100. The tune appeared as the title track for a compilation album, Higher Than Hope, which was released to the American market in 1991.

The album was certified 4× platinum in Australia in 2016. It was written based on his travel to China as a tourist in 1989.

Track listing
"Rise" (Paul Read, Danny McCarthy)
"Nothing to Lose" (Mike Caen, Steve Bull)
"Modern Times" (Roger Hart, Paul Bell)
"Ghost There Waiting" (Jef Scott)
"Waters Rising" (Simon Hussey)
"Higher Than Hope" (Simon Hussey, Daryl Braithwaite)
"Don't Hold Back Your Love" (David Tyson, Richard Page, G. O'Brien)
"The Horses" (Rickie Lee Jones, Walter Becker)
"Where the Famous Came Out to Play" (Jef Scott)
"I Can See Higher Than Before" (Daryl Braithwaite)
"Poverty Dancing" (Phil Manikiza)
"Goodbye Blue Sky" (Simon Hussey, James Reyne)

Personnel
 Daryl Braithwaite – vocals, harmonica on "Waters Rising", Hammond Leslie organ on "Higher than Hope"
 Simon Hussey – keyboards, electric piano, nylon string acoustic guitar (tracks 5 and 12), drum machine (tracks 5–7, 9, and 12), synth bass (tracks 5 and 6), Hammond organ and brass arrangements on "Higher than Hope" (track 6), producer
 Jef Scott – acoustic guitars, electric guitars; bass (tracks 1, 10–12), mandolin (tracks 1 and 5), Dobro (tracks 5, 7, and 9), backing vocals (track 9)
 Andy Cichon – bass (tracks 2, 3, and 5–7)
 John Watson – drums (all tracks except 9 and 10)
 Scott Griffiths – keyboards (tracks 3, 7, 8, 10, and 11), piano (tracks 7 and 8), Hammond organ (tracks 7, 9, and 10), orchestral introduction (track 11)
 "The Brasstards" (tracks 2 and 6)
 Mark Dennison – saxophone
 Kevin Dubber – trumpet
 Tommy Emmanuel – electric guitars (tracks 1 and 8)
 Alex Pertout – percussion (tracks 1, 7, and 8), tuned percussion (tracks 5 and 12), tambourine (track 11)
 Dino Baptiste – harmonica (track 1)
 Jeremy Alsop – bass (track 8)
 Chuck Hargreaves – acoustic guitars (track 12)
 John Farnham – backing vocals (tracks 1, 3, 6, 10, and 12)
 Graeme Strachan – backing vocals (track 2)
 Margaret Urlich – backing vocals (track 8)

Release history

Chart positions

Weekly charts

Year-end charts

Singles

Certifications

References

External links
Daryl Braithwaite- Rise (cassette release with more track-by-track information), Discogs.com.

Daryl Braithwaite albums
1990 albums